A mouse is a small rodent. 

Mouse may also refer to:

People
 Mouse (nickname)
 Stanley Mouse (born 1940), American artist also known simply as "Mouse"
 Ronnie Weiss (born 1942), leader of the band Mouse and the Traps
 Pat Fischer, American football player known as "The Mouse"

Fictional characters
 Mickey Mouse, a cartoon character from Walt Disney Animation Studios
 Minnie Mouse, a cartoon character from Walt Disney Animation Studios
  Mouse (Alice's Adventures in Wonderland)
 Mouse (The Dresden Files)
 Mouse (The Matrix)
 Mouse, a ReBoot character
 Jerry Mouse, a cartoon character from Hanna-Barbera
 Jill "Mouse" Chen of The Carrie Diaries

Science and technology
 Computer mouse, a pointing device
 Mouse (programming language)
 Mouse (set theory)
 Mouse (software), a hydrological engineering software program
 Comper Mouse, a British monoplane, of which one was built in 1933
 Mouse Computer Co., a Japanese PC & laptop manufacturing brand, part of MCJ (company)

Animals
 Marsupial mouse, smaller members of Dasyuridae
 Sea mouse
 Typical mice, of the genus Mus
 Kangaroo mouse
 Brush mouse
 Field mice, genus Apodemus
 Wood mouse
 Yellow-necked mouse
 Large Mindoro forest mouse
 Florida mouse
 Big-eared hopping mouse
 Luzon montane forest mouse
 Forrest's mouse
 Pebble-mound mouse
 Golden mouse
 Bolam's mouse
 Harvest mouse (disambiguation)

Other uses
 "The Mouse", a common nickname for the Walt Disney Company, after the company mascot Mickey Mouse
 Mouse (bull)
 Mouse (film), a 2012 Sri Lankan film
 Mouse (G.I. Joe), a character in the short-lived Sgt. Savage and his Screaming Eagles toy line
 Mouse (manga), also adapted into an anime series
 Mouse (shackle)
 Mouse (TV series), a 2021 South Korean television series
 Mouse Island, Bermuda
 Mouse Island, Ohio
 Mouse Tower, a stone tower in Germany
 The Mouse (film), a film directed by Daniel Adams
 Making Opportunities for Upgrading Schools and Education, a youth development organization
 Stay mouse, a nautical term
 in boxing, a type of hematoma

See also
 Mouse's case, a landmark 1608 English law judgment
 Mouse variety (disambiguation)
 Mice (disambiguation)
 Mousse (disambiguation)
 Maus (disambiguation)
 Mus (disambiguation)